Roberta Frank (born 1941) is an American philologist specializing in Old English and Old Norse language and literature. She is Marie Borroff Professor Emeritus of English at Yale University.

Career 
Frank received a B.A. in comparative literature from New York University (1962) and a Ph.D. in comparative literature from Harvard University (1968), with a doctoral dissertation on Wordplay in Old English Poetry. Frank taught at the University of Toronto beginning in 1968, from 1978 as a full professor and from 1995 as University Professor. She was awarded a Guggenheim Memorial Fellowship in 1985. At Toronto, she was involved with the Dictionary of Old English project and served as Director of the Centre for Medieval Studies (1994–99).

In 2000, she joined the Department of English Language and Literature at Yale University, first as the Douglas Tracy Smith Professor of English and then, in 2008, as the Marie Borroff Professor of English. She is also a senior research fellow at the MacMillan Center for International and Area Studies. Frank was elected a fellow of the Medieval Academy of America in 1989, serving as the President of that Academy in 2006, and a fellow of the Royal Society of Canada in 1995. She co-founded the International Society of Anglo-Saxonists (now the International Society for the Study of Early Medieval England) in 1981 serving as First Vice-President (1985-1986), then as its president (1986–87).

Personal life 
Frank was born in the Bronx. She is married to the medieval historian Walter Goffart.

Research 
Frank's research draws upon archaeological as well as literary and linguistic evidence to analyze aspects of early English and Scandinavian texts. Her work has focused on the poetry of England and Scandinavia, including numerous publications on skaldic verse, the early North, and Beowulf. Two festschriften in her honor have been published: Verbal Encounters: Anglo-Saxon and Old Norse Studies, ed. Antonina Harbus and Russell Poole (Toronto: University of Toronto Press, 2005) and The Shapes of Early English Poetry: Style, Form, History, ed. Eric Weiskott and Irina Dumitrescu (Kalamazoo, MI: Medieval Institute Publications, 2019). Her latest book, The Etiquette of Early Northern Verse, appeared in early 2022.

Selected works
 “Some Uses of Paronomasia in Old English Scriptural Verse” (1972) 
 Co-editor, A Plan for the Dictionary of Old English (1973) 
 Old Norse Court Poetry (1978)
 “The Beowulf Poet’s Sense of History” (1982)
 “Germanic Legend in Old English Literature” (1991)
  
 “The Search for the Anglo-Saxon Oral Poet” (1993)
“Like a Bridge of Stones” (2011)
 “Siegfried and Arminius: Scenes from a Marriage” (2013)

External links 
 Yale University faculty page

References 

Linguists from the United States
1941 births
Living people
Harvard Graduate School of Arts and Sciences alumni
Women linguists
Old Norse studies scholars
New York University alumni
Women medievalists
American women academics
21st-century American women